Events in the year 1792 in Norway.

Incumbents
Monarch: Christian VII

Events
 Denmark-Norway declares transatlantic slave trade will be illegal after 1803 (though slavery continues to 1848 in Denmark)

Arts and literature

Sør-Fron Church was built.
Sandar Church was built.

Births
1 January – Henrik Anker Bjerregaard, poet, dramatist and judge (died 1842)
18 November – Even Hammer Holmboe, politician (died 1859)
13 December – Christian Schou, brewer and merchant (died 1874).

Full date unknown
Diderik Bøgvad, politician (died 1857)
Jørgen Flood, merchant and politician (died 1867)
Nils Christensen Ringnæs, politician
Erike Kirstine Kolstad, the first professional native stage actress in Norway (d.1830)

Deaths
14 December - Ole Nilsen Weierholt, wood carver (born 1718)

See also

References